The Villa Rosa is a historic house at 617 West Lafayette in Fayetteville, Arkansas.  It is a two-story wood-frame structure with a brick exterior and a tile hip roof.  The brick is variegated light colors, reflective of the Renaissance Revival style also evident in the arches surmounting the first-floor windows and doorway.  The entrance is sheltered by a portico with classical columns and a small balcony on top.  The house was built in 1925 by Rosa Zagnoni Marinoni, a prominent regional activist for women's rights and the Arkansas poet laureate in 1953.

The house was listed on the National Register of Historic Places in 1990.

See also
National Register of Historic Places listings in Washington County, Arkansas

References

Houses on the National Register of Historic Places in Arkansas
Renaissance Revival architecture in Arkansas
Houses in Fayetteville, Arkansas
National Register of Historic Places in Fayetteville, Arkansas